Giardini di Mirò is an Italian rock band from Cavriago. The group's music is a mix of psychedelia, shoegaze, dream pop, noise, and post punk.

Background

Giardini di Mirò was formed in 1995 from a collaboration between university friends Corrado Nuccini and cartoonist Giuseppe Camuncoli. In 1998, they released their first self-produced EP and began performing live.

The band has published seven studio albums and a number of EPs. They have collaborated with various musicians, including Sara Lov Hood, Alessandro Raina, DNTL, Alias, Hermann & Kleine, Styrofoam, Apparat, Piano Magic, Isan, and Paul Anderson.

Band members
Current
 Jukka Reverberi – vocals, guitar, bass, live electronics (1996–present)
 Corrado Nuccini – vocals, guitar (1995–present)
 Luca Di Mira – keyboards (1995–present)
 Andrea Scarfone – bass (2020–present)
 Emanuele Reverberi – violin, trumpet, live electronics (2002–present)
 Lorenzo Cattalani – drums (2013-presente)

Past
 Alessandro Raina – vocals (2003)
 Lorenzo Lanzi – drums, percussion (1998–2003)
 Francesco Donadello – drums, live electronics, programming (2003–2011)
 Andrea Mancin – drums (2011–2013)
 Andrea Sologni – bass
 Mirko Venturelli – bass, clarinet, saxophone (1997–2020)

Discography

Studio albums
 Rise and Fall of Academic Drifting (2001)
 Punk... Not Diet! (2003)
 Dividing Opinions (2007)
 Il fuoco (2009)
 Good Luck (2012)
 Rapsodia Satanica (2014)
 Different Times (2018)

EPs
 Giardini di Mirò (1998)
 Iceberg (1999)
 The Soft Touch (2002)
 Split with Deep End (2002)
 North Atlantic Treaty of Love, Pt. One (2005)
 North Atlantic Treaty of Love, Pt. Two (2006)
 Del tutto Illusorio (2021)

Soundtracks
 Sangue - La morte non esiste (2006)

Compilations
 The Academic Rise of Falling Drifters (2002)
 Hits for Broken Hearts and Asses (2004)

References

External links
 
 

Italian rock music groups
Italian post-rock groups